The 2014 Web.com Tour was the 25th season of the top developmental tour for the U.S. PGA Tour in men's golf, and the third under the current sponsored name of Web.com Tour. It ran from February 13 to September 21. The season consisted of 25 official money golf tournaments; six of which will be played outside of the United States. Carlos Ortiz won three times to earn promotion to the PGA Tour and was voted Web.com Tour Player of the Year.

Schedule
The following table lists official events during the 2014 season.

Location of tournaments

Money leaders
For full rankings, see 2014 Web.com Tour Finals graduates.

Regular season money leaders
The regular season money list was based on prize money won during the season, calculated in U.S. dollars. The top 25 players on the tour earned status to play on the 2014–15 PGA Tour.

Finals money leaders
A further 25 players earned status to play on the 2014–15 PGA Tour, via the Web.com Tour Finals.

Awards

Notes

References

External links
Official schedule

Korn Ferry Tour seasons
Web.com Tour